The southern kidneyshell (Ptychobranchus jonesi) is a species of freshwater mussel, an aquatic bivalve mollusk in the family Unionidae, the river mussels.

This species is endemic to the United States.

References

Ptychobranchus
Molluscs of the United States
Endemic fauna of the United States
Critically endangered fauna of the United States
Molluscs described in 1934
ESA endangered species
Taxonomy articles created by Polbot